Emperor is a Bolliger & Mabillard Dive Coaster at SeaWorld San Diego. Because of the COVID-19 pandemic, plans for opening the coaster were pushed back to 2021, before a final opening date of March 12, 2022 was announced.

History
On January 5, 2019, SeaWorld San Diego announced that a new Bolliger & Mabillard Dive Coaster would be coming to the park. The ride would be named Mako.

At IAAPA, it was announced that Mako would be changed to Emperor. Instead of being themed to sharks, the ride would now be themed to penguins.

Emperor is the first floorless Dive Coaster in California and the second Dive coaster in California after HangTime at Knott's Berry Farm. Emperor is located on the East side of SeaWorld San Diego and its ride pavilion is accessible via pathways that would normally bring you to Journey to Atlantis.

On August 25, 2021, SeaWorld announced that Emperor would open sometime in March 2022. On January 20, 2022, SeaWorld announced that Emperor would open on March 12, 2022.

Track layout 
Guests leave from the station and begin the  lift hill climb and turn to its drop where it will hold riders for 3.5 to 4 seconds. It then drops riders  at a 90 degree angle into its first inversion, a  immelmann which goes over the drop and then flows into its 2nd inversion, a hard over banked turn that turns riders upside down as they go into another element which can be classified as an inversion but will not entirely invert riders, this element flows into the last element of the ride which is a corkscrew which then leads into a turn and then into a ramp to the station where the train repeats this cycle over again. The ride time estimation of each cycle from leaving and returning to the station is approximately 1 minute and 10 seconds.

References 

SeaWorld San Diego
Roller coasters introduced in 2022
Roller coasters in California
Dive Coasters manufactured by Bolliger & Mabillard
Roller coasters operated by SeaWorld Parks & Entertainment